This is a list of the client rulers of Ancient Rome, sectioned by the kingdom, giving the years the ruler was on the throne, and separating Kings and Queens.

Rome's foreign clients were called amici populi Romani (friends of the Roman people) and listed on the tabula amicorum (table of friends). They did not sign treaties or have formal obligations, but entered into alliance (societas) and friendship (amicitia) with Rome, generally in a dependent state.

Client Kings

Pharos
 Demetrius of Pharos c.222- 219 BC.

Bosporan Kingdom

 Pharnaces 64 BC – 47 BC
 Mithridates I 47 BC – 44 BC
 Asander 47 BC, then 44 BC – 17 BC
 Scribonius 17 BC – 16 BC
 Dynamis with Asander 47 BC, then 44 BC – 17 BC, then with Polemon from 16 BC until her death in 14 BC
 Polemon I 16 BC – 8 BC
 Aspurgus 8 BC – 38 AD
 Rhescuporis I 14 – 42 AD
 Polemon II 38 – 41 AD
 Mithridates II 42 – 46 AD
 Cotys I 46 – 78
 Roman Province 63 – 68
 Rhescuporis II 78 – 93
 Sauromates I 93 – 123
 Cotys II 123 – 131
 Rhoemetalces 131 – 153
 Eupator 154 – 170
 Sauromates II 172 – 210
 Rhescuporis III 211 – 228
 Cotys III 228 – 234
 Sauromates III 229 – 232
 Rhescuporis IV 233 – 234
 Chedosbios 233 – 234 (?)
 Ininthimeus 234 – 239
 Rhescuporis V 240 – 276
 Pharsanzes 253 – 254
 Teiranes 276 – 278
 Sauromates IV 276
 Theothorses 279 – 309
 Rhadamsades 309 – 322
 Rhescuporis VI 314 – 341

Odrysian Kingdom/Sapaeans
 Cotys III (Sapaean) And Rhescuporis II c. 12-18 AD
 Rhoemetalces II c. 19-36 AD
 Rhoemetalces III c. 38-46 AD

Kingdom of Pontus
 Pharnaces II of Pontus
 Darius of Pontus
 Arsaces of Pontus
 Polemon I of Pontus
 Polemon II of Pontus

Kingdom of Emesa
 Gaius Julius Alexio
 Aristobulus Minor

Kingdom of Judea
 Herod the Great 37-4 BC
 Herod Archelaus (in Judea) 4BC-6AD
 Philip the Tetrarch (in Batanea) 4BC-34AD
 Herod Antipas (in Galilee) 4BC-39AD
 Herod Agrippa 37AD-44AD
 Herod Agrippa II 53–100AD

Kingdom of Mauretania
 Ptolemy of Mauretania

Kingdom of Numidia
 Juba II

Kingdom of Chalcis
 Herod of Chalcis 41-48 AD
 Herod Agrippa II 48-53 AD
 Aristobulus of Chalcis 53-???

Kingdom of Armenia
 Artaxias II 33-20 BC
 Tigranes III 20-10 BC
 Tigranes IV 10-5 BC
 Ariobarzanes II of Atropatene 2 BC- 4 AD
 Artavasdes III of Armenia 4-6 AD
 Tigranes V of Armenia 6-12 AD
 Artaxias III 18-35 AD
 Arsaces I of Armenia 35 AD
 Orodes of Armenia 35 AD
 Mithridates of Armenia 35-37 AD
 Orodes of Armenia 37-42 AD
 Mithridates of Armenia 42-51 AD
 Tiridates I of Armenia 52–58 AD
 Tigranes VI of Armenia ???-???
 Axidares of Armenia 110-113 AD
 Parthamasiris of Armenia 113-114 AD
 Vologases III of Parthia 117-144 AD
 Sohaemus of Armenia 144-161 AD
 Bakur 161-164 AD
 Sohaemus of Armenia 164-186 AD
 Khosrov I of Armenia 198-217 AD
 Tiridates II of Armenia 217-252 AD
 Khosrov III the Small 330-339 AD
 Tiran of Armenia 339-350 AD
 Arshak II 350-368 AD
 Pap of Armenia 370-374 AD
 Varazdat 374-378 AD
 Arshak III and Vologases of Armenia 378-386
 Arshak III 387 AD

Kingdom of Cilicia
 Archelaus of Cilicia 17-38 AD
 Antiochus IV of Commagene 38-c. 72 AD

Kingdom of Cappadocia
 Ariobarzanes III of Cappadocia 51-42 BC
 Ariarathes X of Cappadocia 42-36 BC
 Archelaus of Cappadocia 36 BC- 14 AD

Parthia
 Parthamaspates of Parthia 116-??? AD

British Tribes

Regni
Tiberius Claudius Cogidubnus

Trinovantes
Cunobeline 9-35 AD

Client Queens
This is a list of the client queens of ancient Rome, sectioned by the kingdom, and giving the years the queen was on the throne.

Bosporan Kingdom
Gepaepyris
Dynamis

Kingdom of Pontus
 Pythodorida of Pontus

Odrysian Kingdom
Pythodoris II
Antonia Tryphaena

Kingdom of Judea
Salome I (in Jabneh) 4BC-10AD
Mariamne I
Berenice (daughter of Herod Agrippa)

See also
 Roman client kingdoms in Britain
 Ethnarchy of Comana

References

Lists of rulers
Roman client rulers
Client rulers